Nadala  is a city in Bholath Tehsil in Kapurthala district of Punjab State, India. The cityis administrated by a Municipal Councillor who is an elected representative of city as per the constitution of India and Municipality (India).

List of cities near the village 
Bhulath
Kapurthala 
Phagwara 
Sultanpur Lodhi
Kala Sanghian

Air travel connectivity 
The closest International airport to the village is Sri Guru Ram Dass Jee International Airport.

References

External links
 Villages in Kapurthala
 List of Villages in Kapurthala Tehsil

Villages in Kapurthala district